Emil Mrkonic (July 26, 1927 – November 23, 2002) was a former Democratic member of the Pennsylvania House of Representatives.

References

Democratic Party members of the Pennsylvania House of Representatives
1927 births
2002 deaths
20th-century American politicians